is a former Japanese football player.

Playing career
Hara was born in Fukuoka Prefecture on June 4, 1983. After graduating from high school, he joined the J1 League club Júbilo Iwata in 2002. However he did not play in any matches. In 2004, he moved to the J2 League club Shonan Bellmare with teammate Yuya Hikichi. Although he played several matches as forward, he moved to the Regional Leagues club Shizuoka FC in 2005. He retired at the end of the 2005 season.

Club statistics

References

External links

1983 births
Living people
Association football people from Fukuoka Prefecture
Japanese footballers
J1 League players
J2 League players
Júbilo Iwata players
Shonan Bellmare players
Association football forwards